Typhoon Surigae, known in the Philippines as Super Typhoon Bising, was the strongest Northern Hemisphere tropical cyclone to form before the month of May, one of the most intense tropical cyclones on record and the strongest tropical cyclone worldwide in 2021. The second named storm, first typhoon and the first super typhoon of the 2021 Pacific typhoon season, Surigae originated from a low-pressure area south of the Micronesian island of Woleai that organized into a tropical depression on April 12. At 18:00 UTC that day, it strengthened to a tropical storm and was named Surigae by the JMA. The formation of an eye and increasing winds prompted the JMA to upgrade the system to a severe tropical storm on April 13. The storm proceeded to gradually strengthen, and late on April 15, Surigae became a typhoon. This made it the strongest pre-May typhoon on record. Afterward, weakening outflow and an eyewall replacement cycle caused Surigae to gradually weaken as its track shifted north-northwestward in the Philippine Sea. Surigae became an annular tropical cyclone on April 19, following the eyewall replacement cycle, and restrengthened slightly. On April 22, the storm began to rapidly weaken as it accelerated northwestward into unfavorable conditions, transitioning into a subtropical storm the next day. The subtropical system subsequently underwent extratropical transition, which it completed by April 24. Afterward, Surigae's extratropical remnant accelerated northeastward. On April 27, Surigae explosively intensified into a bomb cyclone near the Aleutian Islands, attaining hurricane-force winds. Afterward, the system gradually weakened as it turned eastward, slowing down in the process, before crossing the International Date Line on April 30 and fully dissipating on May 2.

Upon Surigae's naming, watches and warnings were issued for the island of Yap in the Federated States of Micronesia and the islands of Koror and Kayangel in Palau as well. The typhoon left US$4.8 million in damage in Palau after cutting off power, water, and destroying infrastructure. Later, warnings were raised for parts of the Philippines as the typhoon moved closer to the nation, with evacuations taking place in eastern regions of the Visayas. The storm killed at least 10 people and left another eight missing, in addition to causing at least ₱272.8 million (US$5.67 million) in damage in the Philippines.

Meteorological history 

Showers and thunderstorms continued to emerge around the circulation embedded within the disturbance. The Japan Meteorological Agency (JMA) assessed the formation of a tropical depression near ; at the time, the newly designated system was moving slowly west-northwest around the southern periphery of a subtropical ridge. Due to its anticipated track into Philippine waters, the Philippine Atmospheric, Geophysical and Astronomical Services Administration (PAGASA) also began issuing advisories on the tropical depression on April 12. The Joint Typhoon Warning Center (JTWC) issued a Tropical Cyclone Formation Alert later that day, projecting a high likelihood of a significant tropical cyclone emerging; the agency also assessed the disturbance as a tropical depression on April 13.A strong rainband along the tropical depression's northern semicircle became prominent and coalesced around a robust and developing central dense overcast. At 18:00 UTC on the same day, the JMA upgraded the system to a tropical storm and named it Surigae. Surigae was also upgraded to a tropical storm by the JTWC in the early hours of April 14, citing the same favorable environment for development as the system progressed westward in the Philippine Sea. The storm continued to move slowlyat times remaining nearly stationary on April 14and gradually intensified. Its convective activity was initially displaced to the west of its center of circulation, though additional rainbands and thunderstorm development later obscured the central vortex. On April 15, the JMA upgraded Surigae to a severe tropical storm as it moved closer to the island nation of Palau. A formative eye became apparent on microwave satellite imagery of Surigae later that day.

Surigae strengthened into a typhoon by April 16 just north of Palau, making it the first typhoon of the 2021 Pacific typhoon season. The typhoon's convective activity had become tightly wound around its center, indicating additional strengthening. On April 16 at 03:00 UTC, the PAGASA gave it the local name Bising as it entered the Philippine Area of Responsibility. The once obscured eye became apparent through the central overcast, preceding a period of rapid intensification as the storm traversed west-northwestward across conducive environment. Surigae's central dense overcast became colder and better-organized, with a well-defined ring of very cold cloud tops encircling a  diameter eye. Concurrently, an approaching trough produced a gap in the subtropical ridge of high pressure to the north, causing Surigae to slowly curve northwest as it strengthened.

On April 17, the JMA determined that Surigae's central barometric pressure had rapidly fallen to 895 hPa (mbar; 26.43 inHg), as the storm reached its peak intensity. Its 10-minute maximum sustained winds reached  according to the JMA, while one-minute maximum sustained winds reached  according to the JTWC, making it equivalent to a Category 5 super typhoon on the Saffir–Simpson scale (SSHWS); the peak 1-minute sustained winds were also higher for the time of year than any previous typhoon on record. The JTWC also estimated a minimum central pressure of 882 hPa (mbar; 26.05 inHg) for Surigae at the time. Later that day, Surigae began an eyewall replacement cycle causing its eye to become less apparent on satellite imagery and its winds to slightly diminish. The trough to Surigae's north also impeded the typhoon's outflow, resulting in a decrease in environmental favorability for further intensification. On April 18, had Surigae finished its eyewall replacement cycle. By April 19, Surigae had acquired annular characteristics, bearing a symmetrical appearance and a large eye, which was largely surrounded by one large rainband.

The nearby prevalence of dry air and upwelling of cold waters beneath the slow-moving typhoon caused its winds to slacken somewhat. Some reorganization occurred when Surigae began to move north and away from the upwelled waters, with its large eye becoming less ragged; however, additional entrainment of dry air originating from the mid-troposphere over Luzon caused Surigae's structure to degrade further on April 21. Surigae turned northeast away from the Philippines later that day and weakened further, upon entering an environment with strong westerly winds in the upper troposphere. The once large and clear eye dissipated on April 22, leaving behind an increasingly-disheveled cluster of weakening showers and thunderstorms. Soon afterward, all the remaining convection was sheared to the east, as the storm moved over cooler waters. As most of the remaining thunderstorms had dissipated, Surigae transitioned into a subtropical cyclone on April 23 due to interacting with an upper-level atmospheric trough as Surigae traversed a cold oceanic eddy. Late on April 24, the JTWC issued their final advisory on the system, as it was soon to complete its extratropical transition. The JMA declared that Surigae had become extratropical a few hours later.

As an extratropical cyclone, Surigae began to undergo explosive cyclogenesis on April 26, with its central pressure falling 44 hPa (mbar; 1.3 inHg) within 24 hours, while rapidly tracking northeastward. While located to the east of Hokkaido, the system's ten-minute maximum sustained winds reached  at 18:00 UTC that day, and its central pressure bottomed out at 944 hPa (mbar; 27.88 inHg) six hours later. Late on April 27, Surigae's remnant started to weaken, while turning eastward. On the next day, the system's forward motion significantly slowed down. On April 30, Surigae underwent a center reformation, with the original center of low pressure dissipating, and a new low-pressure center forming shortly afterward, which quickly dominated the system. Afterward, Surigae's remnant continued moving eastward, while gradually weakening, before turning northeastward on May 1. On May 2, Surigae's remnant was absorbed into another extratropical cyclone, just south of the Alaskan Panhandle.

Preparations 

Due to the threat of the storm, a Tropical Storm Watch was issued for the island of Yap and Ngulu Atoll on April 14, where in the former, winds exceeded . This was later modified into a Tropical Storm Warning for Ngulu Atoll later that day.

As Surigae entered the Philippine Area of Responsibility, the PAGASA began issuing weather bulletins for the nearby storm. Initial forecasts by the agency suggested that the storm was less likely to make landfall over Luzon, and expected the storm to re-curve away from the Philippines. On April 16, the Department of Transportation in the Philippines suspended all air and land travel to and from Visayas and Mindanao, requested by the Office of Civil Defense, as Surigae approached. In order to avoid agricultural losses, Secretary William Dar of the Department of Agriculture encouraged farmers in the Bicol and Eastern Visayas regions to harvest their crops and for fishermen to "refrain from fishing as conditions may worsen". At 15:00 UTC (23:00 PHT), the PAGASA began issuing Tropical Cyclone Wind Signal #1 for areas in Eastern Visayas and the Caraga Region and in parts of Luzon six hours later.

On April 17, Signal #2 was issued for Catanduanes and the entire island of Samar. Flood advisories were also issued by the PAGASA for three regions in Visayas and Mindanao. In preparation for the intense rains, the National Telecommunications Commission ordered telecommunications companies to prepare facilities in forecasted affected areas, including free calling and charging stations. In the ensuing travel suspension, 2,507 individuals and 61 sea vessels were stranded in ports throughout the country. As early as April 17, preemptive evacuation began in the Bicol Region and the Samar province, and by April 21, 169,072 people were evacuated in the Cagayan Valley, Bicol Region, Eastern Visayas, and Caraga. Flights in Daniel Z. Romualdez Airport and all Tacloban Airports were cancelled on April 18, and other domestic flights were also cancelled on the same day. In addition, 10 domestic flights elsewhere were also cancelled that day. Schools and work activities were suspended in the Bicol Region till April 20. ₱1.5 billion (US$31.05 million) worth of standby funds were prepared for disaster response.

Impact

Micronesia and Palau 
Locally heavy rainfall occurred in parts of Palau and Yap for several days. Large swells from the developing storm brought coastal flooding to Koror and Yap. Residents in those areas were advised to avoid reef lines in the north and west, and to take caution on beaches due to rip currents and large waves. Surigae was the closest typhoon to pass near the island of Palau since Typhoon Haiyan. Restaurants, sporting events and other services were closed in Palau as Surigae approached closer– yet schools remained open. Schools were not suspended until power had been cut off across much of the entire country. Water and cellular services were also downed. There was criticism for the lack of news coverage on the typhoon in Palau most notably. 125 homes across the country were destroyed, while at least 1,500 sustained minor damage. The entire population of Palau, consisting of approximately 18,008 people, was impacted by the typhoon. At least US$2 million worth of infrastructure alone was damaged in Palau. The total amount of damage across health, infrastructure, education, food, communication, utilities and other sectors was assessed at US$4.8 million. President of Palau Surangel Whipps Jr. issued a national state of emergency on April 18. The United States Agency for International Development (USAID) provided US$100,000 for immediate assistance to support those affected. In Guam, emergency supplies were being prepared and donated to communities in need in Palau.

Philippines 

Five people within a boat were required to be rescued off the coast of Pujada Bay due to dangerous sea conditions produced by Surigae. Another boat with two fishermen aboard capsized during midnight on its way to Bantayan Island, with both of two fishermen having to swim back to shore. On April 19, Surigae forced the cargo ship LCU Cebu Great Ocean, carrying twenty crew members and nickel ore, to run aground on the coast of the Province of Surigao del Norte, in the southern Philippines. At least six of the crew members were found dead, while seven were rescued; the search continues for another missing seven crew members. Widespread rainfall totals of up to  occurred in the eastern Philippines, while  of rain fell in Virac, Catanduanes and surrounding areas. A funnel cloud was also briefly reported in Camarines Sur. Twenty-two barangays were flooded in Eastern Visayas, and in the municipality of Jipapad, flooding reached . Power interruptions were experienced in Central Visayas, Eastern Visayas and in Eastern Samar, power was interrupted for the whole province. 109,815 people were displaced by flooding and landslides in the Bicol Region.

Ten deaths were reported due to the typhoon. One person in Southern Leyte and another in Cebu died due to fallen coconut trees. Six crew members of the LCU Cebu Great Ocean were found dead after the ship ran aground in the southern Philippines; another seven crew members remain missing. Another person remains missing in Northern Samar. 13 others were injured. A total of 3,385 houses were damaged in the Bicol Region, Eastern Visayas and Caraga, with 158 totally destroyed. Agricultural damage in the Bicol Region and Eastern Visayas reached ₱261.9 million (US$5.43 million), while infrastructural damage totaled ₱10.87 million (US$226,000). 63 cities experienced power interruptions; however, power was restored in 54 of those cities.

Following the passage of Surigae, the Department of Social Welfare and Development (DSWD) and local government units provided assistance worth approximately ₱6.52 million (US$135,000) to those affected in Cagayan Valley, the Bicol Region and the Eastern Visayas. Schools and workplaces fully reopened by April 20.

Elsewhere
The influence of Surigae caused gusts in North Sulawesi that reached . Large waves of  affected the coastal waters of the Sitaro Islands Regency, Sangihe Islands Regency, the Talaud Islands and the northern Molucca Sea.
Surigae made its closest approach to Taiwan on April 22. The typhoon's outer bands brought much-needed rainfall to central Taiwan, which was going through its worst drought in 56 years. There were also reports of hail.

See also 

 Weather of 2021
 Tropical cyclones in 2021
 Other tropical cyclones named Bising
 Typhoon Marie (1976) – took a similar track, impacted Palau and Eastern Philippines
 Typhoon Roy (1988) – the second-most intense January tropical cyclone on record in the Western Pacific basin
 Typhoon Mitag (2002) – another strong early-season typhoon that took a somewhat similar path.
 Typhoon Songda (2011) – took a similar track and went on to impact Japan
 Typhoon Maysak (2015) – the most powerful typhoon in the basin to form before April, affected similar areas.
 Typhoon Wutip (2019) – strongest February typhoon on record

Notes

References

External links 

JMA General Information of Typhoon Surigae (2102) from Digital Typhoon
JMA Best Track Data of Typhoon Surigae (2102) (Date Released July 15)
JMA Best Track Data (Graphics) of Typhoon Surigae (2102)
JTWC Best Track Data of Super Typhoon 02W (Surigae)
02W.SURIGAE from the U.S. Naval Research Laboratory

Surigae
Surigae
Surigae 2021
April 2021 events in Asia
Surigae 2021
Surigae 2021
Typhoons